Hierodoris stella is a species of moth in the family Oecophoridae. This species is endemic to New Zealand and occurs in Auckland, Taranaki, Hawkes Bay, Bay of Plenty and Wellington. As at 2005 the larvae of this species is unknown as is its host plant. It is classified as "At Risk, Relict'" by the Department of Conservation.

Taxonomy 
This species was first described by Edward Meyrick in 1914 using a specimen collected at Kauri Gully, Auckland by Stella Hudson and named Coridomorpha stella. George Hudson illustrated and discussed the species in his 1928 book The Butterflies and Moths of New Zealand.  In 2005 Robert J. B. Hoare placed this species within the genus Hierodoris. The type specimen of this species is held at the Natural History Museum, London.

Description 
 
 
Meyrick described the species as follows:

Distribution 
This species is endemic to New Zealand. It occurs in Auckland, Taranaki, Hawkes Bay, Bay of Plenty and Wellington. This species has been collected at Kauri Glen Reserve in Northcote  and in Karori.

Biology and lifecycle
The larvae of this species is unknown as is much of the biology of this species. The adults of this species are on the wing in January and February. George Hudson noted that the female moth appeared to mimic a bug when at rest or walking. The antennae of the moth as well as its posture when at rest makes it appear like a Romna capsoides. It has been hypothesised that this is protective mimicry for the moth as the bug it imitates has an objectionable taste and odour.

Host species and habitat
The plant host species of H. stella are unknown. The adult moth frequents forest.

Conservation status 
This moth is classified under the New Zealand Threat Classification system as being "At Risk, Relict".

References

Moths of New Zealand
Endemic fauna of New Zealand
Moths described in 1914
Oecophoridae
Endangered biota of New Zealand
Taxa named by Edward Meyrick
Endemic moths of New Zealand